Stenoma pyrrhias is a moth of the family Depressariidae. It is found in Guyana.

The wingspan is 18–22 mm. The forewings are violet-ochreous brown with the costal edge yellow ochreous. The plical and second discal stigmata are rather dark violet fuscous, cloudy and obscure. The hindwings are dull fulvous.

References

Moths described in 1915
Taxa named by Edward Meyrick
Stenoma